Taoism ( or ; Wade-Giles) or Daoism (Pinyin) refers to a set of Chinese traditions and religions which emphasize living in harmony with the Dao ('Path'). The Dao is generally defined as the source of everything and the ultimate principle underlying reality. The Daodejing and the Zhuangzi are widely considered key Daoist texts.

Daoism includes various self-cultivation methods, including meditation, internal alchemy, and various rituals. Common aims include becoming one with the natural flow of the Dao, longevity, becoming a sage (zhenren) and even an immortal (xian). Daoist ethics vary depending on the particular school, but they generally tend to emphasize virtues like: "non-action", "naturalness" or "spontaneity", "simplicity", and the three treasures: compassion, frugality and humility.

The roots of Daoism go back at least to the 4th century BCE. Early Daoism drew its cosmological notions from the School of Yinyang (also known as "the Naturalists"). Other influences include: Shang and Zhou dynasty religion, Mohism, Confucianism, Legalist theorists like Shen Buhai and Han Fei, and the Chinese classics, especially the I Ching and the Lüshi Chunqiu.

Daoism has had a profound influence on Chinese culture in the course of the centuries and Dao masters, a title traditionally attributed only to the clergy and not to their lay followers, usually take care to note the distinction between their ritual tradition and the practices of Chinese folk religion and non-Daoist vernacular ritual orders, which are often mistakenly identified as pertaining to Daoism. Chinese alchemy (especially "internal alchemy" - neidan), Chinese astrology, Chan (Zen) Buddhism, several Chinese martial arts including Tai chi, traditional Chinese medicine, feng shui and many styles of Qigong have been associated with Daoism throughout history.

Today, the Daoist religion is one of the five religious doctrines officially recognized by the People's Republic of China (PRC), including in its special administrative regions (SARs) of Hong Kong and Macau. It is also a major religion in Taiwan as well as throughout the Sinosphere and has a significant number of adherents in a number of other societies throughout East and Southeast Asia, particularly in Malaysia, Singapore and Vietnam. Daoism also has adherents in the West, which includes Asian immigrants as well as Western convert Daoists.

Definition

Spelling and pronunciation

Since the introduction of the Pinyin system for romanizing Mandarin Chinese, there have been those who have felt that "Taoism" would be more appropriately spelled as "Daoism". The Mandarin Chinese pronunciation for the word  (way, path) is spelled as tao4 in the older Wade–Giles romanization system (from which the spelling 'Taoism' is derived), while it is spelled as dào in the newer Pinyin romanization system (from which the spelling "Daoism" is derived). The Wade–Giles tao4 and the Pinyin dào are pronounced identically in Mandarin Chinese (like the unaspirated 't' in 'stop'); despite this, "Taoism" and "Daoism" are often pronounced differently in English vernacular.

Categorization and terminology
The word Daoism is used to translate different Chinese terms:
 Teachings of the Dao (lit. "teachings of the Tao"), often interpreted as the "Daoist religion" proper, or the "liturgical" aspect of Daoism – A family of organized religious movements sharing concepts or terminology from "Daoist philosophy"; the first of these being the Celestial Masters school.
 Family of the Dao (lit. "school or family of the Tao", sometimes "Daoist Philosophy") or "Taology" (lit. "study of the Tao"), or the mystical aspect – The philosophical doctrines based on the texts of the I Ching, the Tao Te Ching and the Zhuangzi. The earliest recorded uses of the term Tao to refer to a philosophy or a school of thought are found in the works of classical historians during Han Dynasty. These works include The Commentary of Zhuo (左传; zuǒ zhuàn) by Zuo Qiuming (左丘明) and in the Records of the Grand Historian (史記; Shǐjì) by Sima Tan. This usage of the term to narrowly denote a school of thought precedes the emergence of the Celestial Masters and associated later religions. It is unlikely that Zhuangzi was familiar with the text of the Tao Te Ching, and Zhuangzi himself may have died before the term was in use.

The use of the term Dàojiā dates back to the Han dynasty (around 100 BCE) and was used to refer to the supposed authors of texts like the Dàodéjīng and the Zhuāngzǐ.

The distinction between Daoist philosophy (道家) and religion (道教) was defended by modern pioneers of Chinese philosophy like Feng Youlan (馮友蘭; 1895-1990) and Wing-tsit Chan (陳榮捷; 1901–1994). This distinction is rejected by the majority of Western and Japanese scholars however. This distinction is contested by hermeneutic (interpretive) difficulties in the categorization of the different Daoist schools, sects and movements. Regarding this distinction, Russell Kirkland writes that "most scholars who have seriously studied Taoism, both in Asia and in the West" have abandoned this "simplistic dichotomy".

Similarly, Louis Komjathy writes that this is an untenable misconception because "the association of daojia with "thought" (sixiang) and of daojiao with "religion) (zongjiao) is a modern Chinese construction largely rooted in earlier Chinese literati, European colonialist, and Protestant missionary interpretations." Komjathy argues that none of these terms were understood in this bifurcated "philosophy/religion" manner in the pre-modern era. Daojia was a taxonomical category for Daoist texts which was eventually applied in the early medieval period for Daoist movements and priests. Meanwhile, Daojiao was originally used to distinguish Daoist tradition from Buddhism (fojiao). Thus, Daojiao included daojia. Furthermore, Komjathy notes that the earliest Daoist texts also "reveal a religious community composed of master-disciple lineages". Thus, according to Komjathy, "Daoism was a religious tradition from the beginning."

The Chinese-American philosopher Chung-ying Cheng also views Daoism as a religion, one that has been embedded into Chinese history and tradition, while also assuming many different forms, including "forms of philosophy and practical wisdom". Chung-ying Cheng also noted that the Daoist view of heaven flows mainly from "observation and meditation, [though] the teaching of the way (Dao) can also include the way of heaven independently of human nature". Daoism can also not be classified as a mere variant of Chinese folk religion. This is because while the two share some similar concepts, much of Chinese folk religion is quite different from the tenets and core teachings of Taoism.

Scholars continue to disagree on the nature of Daoist religion. For example, sinologists like Isabelle Robinet and Livia Kohn agree that "Taoism has never been a unified religion, and has constantly consisted of a combination of teachings based on a variety of original revelations." Meanwhile, Komjathy sees Daoism as "a unified religious tradition characterized by complexity and diversity."

"Daoists" 
Traditionally, the Chinese language does not have terms defining lay people adhering to the doctrines or the practices of Daoism, who fall instead within the field of folk religion. Daoist, in Western sinology, is traditionally used to translate daoshi ("master of the Dao"), thus strictly defining the priests of Daoism, ordained clergymen of a Daoist institution who "represent Taoist culture on a professional basis", are experts of Daoist liturgy, and therefore can employ this knowledge and ritual skills for the benefit of a community.

This role of Daoist priests reflects the definition of Daoism as a "liturgical framework for the development of local cults", in other words a scheme or structure for Chinese religion, proposed first by the scholar and Daoist initiate Kristofer Schipper in The Taoist Body (1986). Daoshi are comparable to the non-Daoist fashi ("ritual masters") of vernacular traditions (the so-called "Faism") within Chinese religion.

The term , with the meaning of "Daoist" as "lay member or believer of Daoism", is a modern invention that goes back to the introduction of the Western category of "organized religion" in China in the 20th century, but it has no significance for most of Chinese society in which Taoism continues to be an "order" of the larger body of Chinese religion.

History

Classical Daoism and its sources 

Scholars like Harold Roth argue that early Daoism was a series of "inner-cultivation lineages" of master-disciple communities. According to Roth, these practitioners emphasized a contentless and non-conceptual apophatic meditation as a way of achieving union with the Dao. According to Komjathy, their worldview "emphasized the Dao as sacred, and the universe and each individual being as a manifestation of the Dao." These communities were also closely related to and intermixed with the fangshi (method master) communities.

Other scholars, like Russell Kirkland, argue that before the Han dynasty, there were no real "Daoists" or "Daoism". Instead, there were various sets of behaviors, practices and interpretative frameworks (like the ideas of the Yijing, yin-yang thought, as well as Mohist, "Legalist", and "Confucian" ideas) which were eventually synthesized in the medieval era into the first forms of "Daoism".

Whatever the case, some of the main early Daoist sources include: the Neiye, the Zhuangzi, and the Daodejing. The Daodejing (Tao Te Ching), which is attributed to Laozi (the "Old Master"), is dated by scholars to sometime between the 4th century BCE and the 6th century BCE. Laozi's historicity is disputed, with many scholars seeing him as a legendary founding figure.

Early Daoism drew on the ideas found in the religion of the Shang dynasty and the Zhou dynasty, such as their use of divination and ancestor worship and the idea of Heaven (Tian) and its relationship to humanity. According to modern scholars of Daoism, such as Russell Kirkland and Livia Kohn, Daoist thought also developed by drawing on numerous schools of thought from the Warring States Period (4th to 3rd centuries BCE), including Mohism, Confucianism, Legalist theorists like Shen Buhai and Han Fei which speak of wu-wei, the School of Naturalists (from which Taoism draws its main cosmological ideas, ying yang and the five phases), and the Chinese classics, especially the I Ching and the Lüshi Chunqiu.

Meanwhile, Robinet identifies four components in the emergence of Taoism: the teachings found in the Daodejing and Zhuangzi, techniques for achieving ecstasy, practices for achieving longevity and becoming an immortal (xian), and practices for exorcism. Robinet also states that some elements of Daoism may be traced to prehistoric folk religions in China. In particular, many Daoist practices drew from the Warring States era phenomena of the wu (Chinese shamans) and the fangshi ("method masters", which probably derived from the "archivist-soothsayers of antiquity").

Both terms were used to designate individuals dedicated to "...magic, medicine, divination,... methods of longevity and to ecstatic wanderings" as well as exorcism. The fangshi were philosophically close to the School of Naturalists, and relied much on astrological and calendrical speculations in their divinatory activities. Female shamans played an important role in the early Taoist tradition, which was particularly strong in the southern state of Chu. Early Taoist movements developed their own tradition in contrast to shamanism while also absorbing shamanic elements.

During the early period, some Daoists lived as hermits or recluses who did not participate in political life, while others sought to establish a harmonious society based on Daoist principles. Zhuang Zhou (c. 370–290 BCE) was the most influential of the Daoist hermits. Some scholars holds that since he lived in the south, he may have been influenced by Chinese shamanism. Zhuang Zhou and his followers insisted they were the heirs of ancient traditions and the ways of life of by-then legendary kingdoms. Pre-Daoist philosophers and mystics whose activities may have influenced Daoism included shamans, naturalists skilled in understanding the properties of plants and geology, diviners, early environmentalists, tribal chieftains, court scribes and commoner members of governments, members of the nobility in Chinese states, and the descendants of refugee communities.

Early Organized Daoism 

By the Han dynasty (206 BCE–220 CE), the various sources of Daoism had coalesced into a coherent tradition of ritualists in the state of Shu (modern Sichuan). One of the earliest forms of Daoism was the Han era (2nd century BCE) Huang–Lao movement, which was an influential school of thought at this time. The Huainanzi and the Taipingjing are important sources from this period. Also during the Han, the earliest extant commentaries on the Daodejing were written: the Heshang Gong commentary and the Xiang'er commentary.

The first organized form of Daoism was the Way of the Celestial Masters (Tianshi Dao), which developed from the Five Pecks of Rice movement at the end of the 2nd century CE. The latter had been founded by Zhang Taoling, who was said to have had a vision of Laozi in 142 and claimed that the world was coming to an end. Zhang sought to teach people to repent and prepare for the coming cataclysm, after which they would become the seeds of a new era of great peace (taiping). It was a mass movement in which men and women could act as libationers and tend to the commoners. A related movement arose in Shandong called the "Way of Great Peace", seeking to create a new world by replacing the Han dynasty. This movement led to the Yellow Turban Rebellion and after years of bloody war they were crushed.

The Celestial Masters movement survived this period and did not take part in attempting to replace the Han. As such they grew and became an influential religion during the Three Kingdoms period, focusing on ritual confession and petition, as well as developing a well-organized religious structure. The Celestial Masters school was officially recognized by the warlord Cao Cao in 215, legitimizing Cao Cao's rise to power in return. Laozi received imperial recognition as a divinity in the mid-2nd century BCE.

Another important early Daoist movement was Taiqing (Great Clarity) which was a tradition of external alchemy (weidan) that sought immortality through the concoction of elixirs, often using toxic elements like cinnabar, lead, mercury, and realgar, as well as ritual and purificatory practices.

After this point, Taoism did not have nearly as significant an effect on the passing of law as the syncretic Confucian-Legalist tradition.

Three Kingdoms and Six Dynasties eras 

The Three Kingdoms Period saw the rise of the Xuanxue (Mysterious Learning or Deep Wisdom) tradition, which focused on philosophical inquiry and also integrated Confucian teachings with Daoist thought. The movement included scholars like Wang Bi (226-249), He Yan (d. 249), Xiang Xiu (223?-300), Guo Xiang (d. 312) and Pei Wei (267-300). Another later influential figure was the 4th century alchemist Ge Hong, who wrote a key Daoist work on inner cultivation, the Baopuzi (Master Embracing Simplicity).

The Six Dynasties (316–589) era saw the rise of two new Daoist traditions, Shangqing (Supreme Clarity) and Lingbao (Numinous Treasure). Shangqing was based on a series of revelations by gods and spirits to a certain Yang Xi between 364 and 370. As Kohn writes, these revelations included detailed descriptions of the heavens as well as "specific methods of shamanic travels or ecstatic excursions, visualizations, and alchemical concoctions." The Shangqing revelations also introduced many new Daoist scriptures.

Similarly, between 397 and 402, Ge Chaofu compiled a series of scriptures which later served as the foundation of the Lingbao school, which was most influential during the later Song dynasty (960–1279) and focused on scriptural recitation and the use of talismans for harmony and longevity. The Lingbao school also practiced purification rituals called purgations (zhai) in which talismans were empowered. Lingbao also adopted Mahayana Buddhist elements. According to Livia Kohn they "integrated aspects of Buddhist cosmology, worldview, scriptures, and practices, and created a vast new collection of Daoist texts in close imitation of Buddhist sutras." Komjathy also notes that they adopted the Mahayana Buddhist universalism in its promotion of "universal salvation" (pudu).

During this period, Louguan, the first Daoist monastic institution (influenced by Buddhist monasticism) was established in the Zhongnan mountains by a local daoist master named Yin Tong. This tradition was called the Northern Celestial masters and their main scripture was the Xisheng jing (Scripture of Western Ascension).

During the sixth century, Daoists attempted to unify the various traditions into one integrated Daoism that could compete with Buddhism and Confucianism. To do this they adopted the schema known as the "three caverns", first developed by the scholar Lu Xiujing (406-477) based on the "three vehicles" of Buddhism. The three caverns were: Perfection (Dongzhen), associated with the Three Sovereigns, Mystery (Dongxuan) associated with Lingbao, and Spirit (Dongshen) associated with the Supreme Clarity tradition. Lu also used this schema to arrange the Daoist scriptures and Daoist deities. Lu Xiujing also worked to compile the first edition of the Daozang (the Daoist Canon), which was published at the behest of the Chinese emperor. Thus, according to Kirkland, "in several important senses, it was really Lu Hsiu-ching who founded Taoism, for it was he who first gained community acceptance for a common canon of texts, which established the boundaries, and contents, of “the teachings of the Tao” (Tao-chiao). Lu also reconfigured the ritual activities of the tradition, and formulated a new set of liturgies, which continue to influence Taoist practice to the present day."

This period also saw the development of the Three Pure Ones, which merged the high deities from different Daoist traditions into a common trinity that has remained influential until today.

Later Imperial Dynasties 

The new Integrated Daoism, now with a united Daoist identity, gained official status in China during the Tang dynasty. This tradition was termed Daojiao (the teaching of the Dao). The Tang was the height of Daoist influence, during which Daoism, led by the Patriarch of Supreme Clarity, was the dominant religion in China. According to Kirkland, this new Daoist synthesis had its main foundation in the Lingbao school's teachings, which was appealing to all classes of society and drew on Mahayana Buddhism.

Perhaps the most important figure of the Tang was the court Daoist and writer Du Guangting (850–933). Du wrote numerous works on Daoist rituals, history, myth, and biography and he also reorganized and edited the Daozang after a period of war and loss. 

During the Tang, several emperors became patrons of Daoism, inviting priests to court to conduct rituals and enhance the prestige of the sovereign. The Gaozong Emperor even decreed that the Daodejing was also to be a topic in the imperial examinations. During the reign of the 7th century Emperor Taizong, the Five Dragons Temple, the first temple at the Wudang Mountains, was constructed. Wudang would eventually become a major center for Daoism and also a home for Daoist martial arts (Wudang quan).

Emperor Xuanzong (r. 712-755) was also a devoted Daoist who wrote various Daoist works and according to Kohn "had frequent meetings with senior masters, ritual specialists, Daoist poets, and official patriarchs, such as Sima Chengzhen." He even reorganized imperial rituals based on Daoist forms, sponsored Daoist shrines and monasteries, and introduced a separate examination system based on Daoism. Another important Daoist figure of the Tang dynasty was Lu Dongbin, who is considered the founder of the jindan meditation tradition and an influential figure in the development of neidan (internal alchemy) practice.

Likewise, several Song dynasty emperors, most notably Huizong, were active in promoting Daoism, collecting Daoist texts and publishing updated editions of the Daozang. The Song era also saw new scriptures, new movements of ritualists and Daoist rites, the most popular of which were the new Thunder Rites (leifa). The Thunder rites were protection and exorcism rites which evoked the celestial department of thunder and they became central to the new Heavenly Heart (Tianxin) tradition as well as for the Youthful Incipience (Tongchu) school.

In the 12th century, the Quanzhen (Complete Perfection) School was founded in Shandong by the sage Wang Chongyang (1113–1170). The school focused on inner transformation, mystical experience, monasticism and asceticism. Quanzhen flourished during the 13th and 14th centuries and during the Yuan dynasty. The Quanzhen school was syncretic, combining elements from Buddhism and Confucianism with Daoist tradition. According to Wang Chongyang, the "three teachings" (Buddhism, Confucianism, Daoism), "when investigated, prove to be but one school". Quanzhen became the largest and most important Daoist school in China when master Qiu Chuji met with Genghis Khan who ended up making him the leader of all Chinese religions as well as exempting Quanzhen institutions from taxation. Another important Quanzhen figure was Zhang Boduan, author of the Wuzhen pian, a classic of internal alchemy and the founder of the southern branch of Quanzhen.

Also during the Song era, the Zhengyi tradition proper developed in Southern China among Daoists of the Chang clan. This liturgically focused tradition would continue to be supported by later emperors and survives to this day.

Under the Ming dynasty (1368–1644), aspects of Confucianism, Daoism, and East Asian Buddhism were consciously synthesized in the Neo-Confucian school, which eventually became Imperial orthodoxy for state bureaucratic purposes. Daoist ideas also influenced Neo-Confucian thinkers like Wang Yangming and Zhan Ruoshui. Also during the Ming, the legends of the Eight Immortals (the most important of which is Lü Dongbin) rose to prominence, being part of local plays and folk culture. Ming emperors like the Hongwu Emperor also continued to invite Daoists to court and hold Daoist rituals which were believed to enhance the power of the throne. The most important of these were connected with the (especially those connected with the Daoist deity Xuanwu ("Perfect Warrior"), which was the main dynastic protector deity of the Ming. 

The Ming era also saw the rise of the Jingming ("Pure Illumination") school to prominence, which merged Daoism with Buddhist and Confucian teachings and focused on "purity, clarity, loyalty and filial piety".  The school derided internal and external alchemy, fasting (bigu), and breathwork and instead focused on using mental cultivation to return to the mind's original purity and clarity (which could become obscured by desires and emotions). Key figures of this school include Xu Xun, Liu Yu, Huang Yuanji and Xu Yi and Liu Yuanran. Some of these figures taught at the imperial capital and were awarded titles. Their emphasis on practical ethics and self-cultivation in everyday life (rather than ritual or monasticism) made it very popular among the literati class.

The Qing dynasty (1644–1912) mainly promoted Buddhism as well as Neo-Confucianism. Thus, during this period, the status and influence of Daoism declined. During the 18th century, the Qing imperial library excluded virtually all Daoist books.

The Qing era also saw the birth of the Longmen ("Dragon Gate" ) school of Wang Kunyang (1552–1641), a branch of Quanzhen from southern China that became established at the White Cloud Temple. Longmen authors like Liu Yiming (1734–1821) and Min Yide (1758–1836) worked to promote and preserve Daoist inner alchemy practices through books like The Secret of the Golden Flower. The Longmen school synthesized the Quanzhen and neidan teachings with the Chan Buddhist and Neo-Confucian elements that the Jingming tradition had developed, making it widely appealing to the literati class.

Early modern Daoism 

During the 19th and 20th centuries, Daoism suffered much destruction as a result of religious persecution and numerous wars and conflicts that beset China in the so called century of humiliation. This period of persecution was caused by numerous factors including Confucian prejudices, anti-traditional Chinese modernist ideologies, European and Japanese colonialism, and Christian missionization. By the 20th century, only one complete copy of the Daozang survived intact, stored at the White Cloud Monastery in Beijing. A key Daoist figure during this period was Chen Yingning (1880-1969). He was a key member of the early Chinese Daoist Association and wrote numerous books promoting Daoist practice 

During the Cultural Revolution (1966-1976), many Daoist priests were laicized and sent to work camps and many Daoist sites and temples were destroyed or converted to secular use. This period saw an exodus of Daoists out of China. They immigrated to Korea, Malaysia, Singapore, Taiwan, Thailand and to Europe and North America. Thus, the communist repression had the consequence of making Daoism a world religion by disseminating Daoists throughout the world.

The 20th century was also a creative period for Daoism despite its many setbacks. The Daoist influenced practice of Tai Chi developed during this time, led by figures like Yang Chengfu and Sun Lutang. Early proponents of Tai Chi Quan, like Sun Lutang, claimed that Tai Chi was a Daoist internal practice created by the Daoist immortal Zhang Sanfeng (though modern scholars note that this claim lacks credible historical evidence).

Late modern Daoism 

Daoism began to recover during the Reform and Opening up period (beginning in 1979) after which it experienced increased religious freedom in mainland China. This led to the restoration of many temples and communities, the publishing of Daoist literature and the preservation of Daoist material culture. Several Chinese intellectuals, like Hu Fuchen (Chinese Academy of Social Studies) and Liu Xiaogan (Chinese University of Hong Kong) have worked to developed a "New Daojia" (xin daojia), which parallels the rise of New Confucianism.

During the 1980s and 1990s, China experienced the so called Qigong fever, which saw a surge in the popularity of Qigong practice throughout China. During this period many new Daoist and Daoist influenced religions sprung up, the most popular being those associated with Qigong, such as Zangmigong (Tantric Qigong influenced by Tibetan Buddhism), Zhonggong (Central Qigong), and Falungong (which came to be outlawed and repressed by the CCP).

Today, Daoism is one of five official recognized religions in the People's Republic of China. In mainland China, the government regulates its activities through the Chinese Taoist Association. Regarding the status of Daoism in mainland China, Kohn writes:

Daoist institutions are state-owned, monastics are paid by the government, several bureaus compete for revenues and administrative power, and training centers require courses in Marxism as preparation for full ordination. Still, temple compounds are growing on the five sacred mountains, on Daoist mountains, and in all major cities.

The White Cloud Temple at Beijing remains the most important center for the training of Daoist monastics on the mainland, while the five sacred mountains of China also contain influential Daoist centers. Other key sites include: Wudangshan, Mount Longhu, Mount Qiyun, Mount Qingcheng, Mount Tai, Zhongnan mountains, Mount Mao, and Mount Lao. Meanwhile, Daoism is also practiced much more freely in Taiwan and Hong Kong, where it is a major religion and retains unique features and movements which differ from mainland Daoism. Daoism is also practiced throughout the wider East Asian cultural sphere.

Outside of China, many traditionally Daoist practices have spread, especially through Chinese emigration as well as conversion by non-Chinese. Daoist influenced practices, like Tai Chi and Qigong, are also popular around the world. As such, Daoism is now a diverse "world religion" with a global distribution.

During the late 20th century, Daoism also began to spread to the Western world, leading to various forms of Daoist communities in the West, with Daoist publications, websites, meditation and Tai chi centers, and translations of Daoist texts by western scholars as well as non-specialists. Daoist classics like the Daodejing have also became popular in the New Age movement and in "popular Western Taoism", a kind of popularized hybrid spirituality. According to Komjathy, this "popular Western Daoism" is associated with popular translations and interpretations of the Daodejing, and the work of popular figures like James Legge, Alan Watts, John Blofeld, Gia-fu Feng, and Bruce Lee. This popular spirituality also draws on Chinese martial arts (which are often unrelated to Daoism proper), American Transcendentalism, 1960s counterculture, New Age spirituality, the perennial philosophy and Alternative medicine.

On the other hand, traditionally minded Daoists in the West are often either ethnically Chinese or generally assume some level of sinification, especially the adoption of Chinese language and culture. This is because, for most traditional Daoists, the religion is not seen as separate from Chinese ethnicity and culture. As such, most Western convert Daoist groups are led either by Chinese teachers or by teachers who studied with Chinese teachers. Some prominent Western Daoist associations include: Associacion de Taoism de España, Association Francaise Daoiste, British Daoist Association, Daoist Foundation (San Diego, California), American Taoist and Buddhist Association (New York), Ching Chung Taoist Association (San Francisco), Universal Society of the Integral Way (Ni Hua-Ching), and Sociedade Taoista do Brasil.

Particularly popular in the West are groups which focus on internal martial arts like Taijiquan, as well as Qigong and meditation. A smaller set of groups also focus around internal alchemy, such as Mantak Chia's Healing Dao. While traditional Daoism initially arrived in the West through Chinese immigrants, more recently, Western run Daoist temples have also appeared, such as the Taoist Sanctuary in San Diego and the Dayuan Circle in San Francisco. Kohn notes that all of these centers "combine traditional ritual services with Daode jing and Yijing philosophy as well as with various health practices, such as breathing, diet, meditation, qigong, and soft martial arts."

Teachings

Dao 

Dao (Wade-Giles: Tao) can mean way, road, channel, path, doctrine, or line. Livia Kohn describes the Dao as "the underlying cosmic power which creates the universe, supports culture and the state, saves the good and punishes the wicked. Literally “the way,” Dao refers to the way things develop naturally, the way nature moves along and living beings grow and decline in accordance with cosmic laws." The Dao is ultimately indescribable and transcends all analysis and definition. Thus the Daodejing begins with: “The Dao that can be told is not eternal Dao.” Likewise, Komjathy writes that Dao has been described by Daoists as "dark" (xuan), "indistinct" (hu), "obscure" (huang), and "silent" (mo).

According to Komjathy, the Dao has four primary characteristics: "(1) Source of all existence; (2) Unnamable mystery; (3) All-pervading sacred presence; and (4) Universe as cosmological process." As such, Daoist thought can be seen as monistic (the Dao is one reality), panenhenic (seeing nature as sacred), and panentheistic (the Dao is both the sacred world and what is beyond it, immanent and transcendent). Similarly, Chan describes Dao as an "ontological ground" and as "the One, which is natural, spontaneous, eternal, nameless, and indescribable. It is at once the beginning of all things and the way in which all things pursue their course." The Dao is thus an "organic order", which is not a willful or self-conscious creator, but an infinite and boundless natural pattern.

Furthermore, the Dao also is something that individuals can find immanent in themselves, as well as in natural and in social patterns. Thus, the Dao is also the "innate nature" (xing) of all people, a nature which is seen by Daoists as being ultimately good. In a naturalistic sense, the Dao as visible pattern, "the Dao that can be told", i.e. the rhythmic processes and patterns of the natural world which can be observed and described. Thus, Kohn writes that Dao can be explained as twofold: the transcendent, ineffable, mysterious Dao and the natural, visible and tangible Dao.

Throughout Daoist history, Daoists have also developed different metaphysical views regarding the Dao. For example, while the Xuanxue thinker Wang Bi described Dao as wú (nothingness, negativity, not-being), Guo Xiang rejected wú as the source and held that instead the true source was spontaneous “self-production” (zìshēng 自生) and “self-transformation” (zìhuà 自化). Another school, the Chóngxuán (Twofold Mystery), developed a metaphysics influenced by Buddhist Madhyamaka philosophy.

De 

The active expression of Dao is called De (also spelled—Te or Teh; often translated with Virtue or Power), in a sense that De results from an individual living and cultivating the Tao. The term De can be used to refer to ethical virtue, as in the conventional Confucian sense, as well as to a higher spontaneous kind of sagely virtue or power, which comes from following the Dao and practicing wu-wei and is thus a natural expression of the Dao's power, and not anything like conventional morality. Komjathy describes De as the manifestation of one's connection to the Dao, which is a beneficial influence of one's cosmological attunement.

Ziran 

Ziran (lit. "self-so", "self-organization") is regarded as a central concept and value in Daoism and as a way of flowing with the Dao. It describes the "primordial state" of all things as well as a basic character of the Dao, and is usually associated with spontaneity and creativity. According to Kohn, in the Zhuangzi, ziran refers to the fact that "there is thus no ultimate cause to make things what they are. The universe exists by itself and of itself; it is existence just as it is. Nothing can be added or substracted from it; it is entirely sufficient upon itself."

To attain naturalness, one has to identify with the Dao and flow with its natural rhythms as expressed in oneself. This involves freeing oneself from selfishness and desire, and appreciating simplicity. It also involves understanding one's nature and living in accordance with it, without trying to be something one is not or overthinking one's experience. One way of cultivating ziran found in the Zhuangzi is to practice the "fasting of the mind", a kind of Daoist meditation in which one empties the mind. It is held that this can also activate qi (vital energy). In some passages found in the Zhuangzi and in the Daodejing, naturalness is also associated with rejection of the state (anarchism) and a desire to return to simpler pre-technological times (primitivism).

An often cited metaphor for naturalness is pu (lit. "uncut wood"), the "uncarved log", which represents the "original nature... prior to the imprint of culture" of an individual. It is usually referred to as a state one may return to.

Wu-wei 

The polysemous term wu-wei or wuwei constitutes the leading ethical concept in Taoism. Wei refers to any intentional or deliberated action, while wu carries the meaning of "there is no ..." or "lacking, without". Common translations are nonaction, effortless action, action without intent, non-interference and non-intervention. The meaning is sometimes emphasized by using the paradoxical expression "wei wu wei": action without action. Kohn writes that wuwei refers to "letting go of egoistic concerns" and "to abstain from forceful and interfering measures that cause tensions and disruption in favor of gentleness, adaptation, and ease."

In ancient Daoist texts, wu-wei is associated with water through its yielding nature and the effortless way it flows around obstacles. Daoist philosophy, in accordance with the I Ching, proposes that the universe works harmoniously according to its own ways. When someone exerts their will against the world in a manner that is out of rhythm with the cycles of change, they may disrupt that harmony and unintended consequences may more likely result rather than the willed outcome. Thus the Daodejing says: "act of things and you will ruin them. Grasp for things and you will lose them. Therefore the sage acts with non-action and has no ruin, lets go of grasping and has no loss."

Daoism does not identify one's will as the root problem. Rather, it asserts that one must place their will in harmony with the natural way of the universe. Thus, a potentially harmful interference may be avoided, and in this way, goals can be achieved effortlessly. "By wu-wei, the sage seeks to come into harmony with the great Tao, which itself accomplishes by nonaction."

Aspects of the self (xing, xin, and ming)
The Daoist view of the self is a holistic one which rejects the idea of a separate individualized self. As Kirkland writes, Daoists "generally assume that one’s “self” cannot be understood or fulfilled without reference to other persons, and to the broader set of realities in which all persons are naturally and properly embedded." 

In Daoism, one's innate or fundamental nature (xing) is ultimately the Dao expressing or manifesting itself as an embodied person. Innate nature is also connected with one's heartmind (xin), which refers to consciousness, the heart and one's spirit. The focus of Daoist psychology is the heartmind (xin), the intellectual and emotional center (zhong) of a person. It is associated with the chest cavity, the physical heart as well as with emotions, thoughts, consciousness and the storehouse of spirit (shen). When the heartmind is unstable and separated from the Dao, it called the ordinary heartmind (suxin). On the other hand, the original heartmind (benxin) pervades Dao and is constant and peaceful. 

The Neiye (ch.14) calls this pure original heartmind the "inner heartmind", "an awareness that precedes language" and "a lodging place of the numinous". Later Daoist sources also refer to it by other terms like "awakened nature" (wuxing), "original nature" (benxing), "original spirit" (yuanshen) and "scarlet palace". This pure heartmind is seen as being characterized by clarity and stillness (qingjing), purity, pure yang, spiritual insight, and emptiness.

Daoists also see life (sheng) as an expression of the Dao. The Dao is seen as granting each person a ming (life destiny), which is one's corporeal existence, one's body and vitality. Generally speaking, Daoist cultivation seeks a holistic psychosomatic form of training which is described as "dual cultivation of innate nature and life-destiny" (xingming shuanxiu).

The cultivation of innate nature is often associated with the practice of stillness (jinggong) or quiet meditation, while the cultivation of life-destiny generally revolves around movement based practices (dongong) like daoyin and health and longevity practices (yangsheng).

The Daoist body 

Many Daoist practices work with ancient Chinese understandings of the body, its organs and parts, "elixir fields" (dantien), inner substances (such as "essence" or jing), animating forces (like the hun and po) and meridians (qi channels). The complex Daoist schema of the body and its subtle body components contains many parallels with Traditional Chinese medicine and is used for health practices as well as for somatic and spiritual transformation (through neidan - "psychosomatic transmutation" or "internal alchemy"). Daoist physical cultivation rely on purfying and transforming the body's Qi (vital breath, energy) in various ways (including breath control, healing exercises, sexual hygiene, diets, and meditations).

According to Livia Kohn, qi is "the cosmic energy that pervades all. The concrete aspect of Dao, qi is the material force of the universe, the basic stuff of nature." According to the Zhuangzi, “human life is the accumulation of qi; death is its dispersal.” Everyone has some amount of qi and can gain and lose qi in various ways. Therefore, Daoists hold that through various qi cultivation methods they can harmonize their qi, and thus improve health and longevity, and even attain magic powers, social harmony and immortality. The Neiye (Inward Training) is one of the earliest texts that teach qi cultivation methods.

Qi is also one of the Three Treasures, which is a specifically Daoist schema of the main elements in Daoist physical practices like qigong and neidan. The three are: jīng ( 精, essence, the foundation for one's vitality), qì (氣) and shén (神, spirit, subtle consciousness, a capacity to connect with the subtle spiritual reality). These three are further associated with the three "elixir fields" (dantien) and the organs in different ways.

Ethics

Daoist ethics tends to emphasize various themes from the Daoist classics, such as naturalness (pu), spontaneity (ziran), simplicity, detachment from desires, and most important of all, wu wei. The classic Daoist view is that humans are originally and naturally aligned with Dao, thus their original nature is said to be inherently good. However, one can fall away from this due to personal habits, desires, and social conditions, and return to one's nature requires active attunement through Daoist practice and ethical cultivation.

Some of the most important virtues in Daoism are the Three Treasures or Three Jewels. These are: ci (usually translated as compassion), jian (usually translated as moderation), and bugan wei tianxia xian (literally "not daring to act as first under the heavens", but usually translated as humility). Arthur Waley, applying them to the socio-political sphere, translated them as: "abstention from aggressive war and capital punishment", "absolute simplicity of living", and "refusal to assert active authority".

Daoism also adopted the Buddhist doctrines of karma and reincarnation into its religious ethical system. Medieval Daoist thought also developed the idea that ethics was overseen by a celestial administration which kept records of people's actions and their fate, as well as handed out rewards and punishments through particular celestial administrators.

Soteriology and religious goals

Daoists have diverse religious goals which include Daoist conceptions of sagehood (zhenren), spiritual self-cultivation, a happy afterlife, as well as longevity and some form of immortality (xian, variously understood as a kind of transcendent post-mortem state of the spirit). 

In the Quanzhen school of Wang Chongyang, the goal is to become a sage, which he equates with being a "spiritual immortal" (shen xien) and with the attainment of "clarity and stillness" (qingjing) through the integration of “inner nature” (xing) and “worldly reality” (ming).

Those who know the Dao, who flow with the natural way of the Dao and thus embody the patterns of the Dao are called sages or "perfected persons" (zhenren). They often are depicted as living simple lives, as craftsmen or hermits. In other cases, they are depicted as the ideal rulers which practice ruling through non-intervention and under which nations prosper peacefully. Sages are the highest humans, mediators between heaven and earth and the best guides on the Daoist path. They act naturally and simply, with a pure mind and with wuwei. They may have supernatural powers and bring good fortune and peace. 

Some sages are also considered to have become one of the immortals (xian) through their mastery of the Dao. After shedding their mortal form, spiritual immortals may have many superhuman abilities like flight and are often said to live in heavenly realms. 

The sages as thus because they have attained the primary goal of Daoism: a union with the Dao and harmonization or alignment with its patterns and flows. This experience is one of being attuned to the Dao and to our own original nature, which already has a natural capacity for resonance (ganying) with Dao. This is the main goal that all Daoist practices are aiming towards and can be felt in various ways, such as a sense of psychosomatic vitality and aliveness as well as stillness and a "true joy" (zhenle) or "celestial joy" that remains unaffected by mundane concerns like gain and loss.

Cosmology 

Daoist cosmology is cyclic—the universe is seen as being in constant change, with various forces and energies (qi) affecting each other in different complex patterns. Daoist cosmology shares similar views with the School of Naturalists. Daoist cosmology focuses on the impersonal transformations (zaohua) of the universe which are spontaneous and unguided.

Livia Kohn explains the basic Daoist cosmological theory as follows:

the root of creation Dao rested in deep chaos (ch. 42). Next, it evolved into the One, a concentrated state cosmic unity that is full of creative potential and often described in Yijing terms as the Great Ultimate (Taiji). The One then brought forth “the Two,” the two energies yin and yang, which in turn merged in harmony to create the next level of existence, “the Three” (yin-yang combined), from which the myriad beings came forth. From original oneness, the world thus continued to move into ever greater states of distinction and differentiation.

The main distinction in Daoist cosmology in that between yin and yang, which applies to various sets of complementary ideas: bright - dark, light - heavy, soft - hard, strong - weak, above - below, ruler - minister, male - female, and so on. Cosmically, these two forces exist in mutual harmony and interdependence. Yin and yang are further divided into five phases (Wu Xing, or five materials): minor yang, major yang, yin/yang, minor yin, major yin. Each of these is correlated with a specific substance: wood, fire, earth, metal, water respectively. This schema is used in a variety of different ways in Daoist thought and practice, from nourishing life (yangsheng) and medicine to astrology and divination.

Daoists also generally see all things as being animated and constituted by qi (vital air, subtle breath), which is seen as a force that circulates throughout the universe and throughout human bodies (as both air in the lungs and as a subtle breath throughout the body's meridians and organs). Qi is in constant transformation between its condensed state (i.e. life) and diluted (potential) state. These two different states of qi, on the other hand, are embodiments of yin and yang, two complementary forces that constantly play against and with each other and one cannot exist without the other.

Daoist texts present various creation stories and cosmogonies. Classic cosmogonies are non-theistic, presenting a natural undirected process in which an apophatic undifferentiated potentiality (called wuwuji, "without non-differentiation") naturally unfolds into wuji (primordial oneness, "non-differentiation"), which then evolves into yin-yang (i.e. taiji) and then into the myriad beings (as in the Daode jing). However, later medieval models also included the idea of a creator God, which was mainly seen as Lord Lao, which represents order and creativity. Daoist cosmology in turn influences Daoist soteriology, which holds that one can "return to the root" (guigen) of the universe (and of ourselves) which is also the Dao, the impersonal source (yuan) of all things.

In Daoism, human beings are seen as a microcosm of the universe, and thus the cosmological forces, like the five phases, are also present in the form of the zang-fu organs. Another common belief is that there are various gods that reside in human bodies. As a consequence, it is believed that a deeper understanding of the universe can be achieved by understanding oneself.

Another important element of Daoist cosmology is the use of the Chinese astrology.

Theology

Daoist theology can be defined as apophatic, given its philosophical emphasis on the formlessness and unknowable nature of the Dao, and the primacy of the "Way" rather than anthropomorphic concepts of God. This is one of the core beliefs that nearly all the sects share.

However, Daoism does include many deities and spirits and thus can also be considered animistic and polytheistic in a secondary sense (since are considered to be emanations from the impersonal and nameless ultimate principle). Daoist orders usually present the Three Pure Ones at the top of the pantheon of deities, visualizing the hierarchy emanating from the Dao. Laozi is considered the incarnation of one of the three and worshiped as the ancestral founder of Daoism.

Different branches of Daoism often have differing pantheons of lesser deities, where these deities reflect different notions of cosmology. Lesser deities also may be promoted or demoted for their activity. Some varieties of popular Chinese religion incorporate the Jade Emperor (Yü-Huang or Yü-Di), one of the Three Pure Ones, as the highest God. Historical Daoist figures, and people who are considered to have become immortals (xian), are also venerated as well by both clergy and laypeople.

Despite these hierarchies of deities, traditional conceptions of Dao should not be confused with the Western theism. Being one with the Dao does not necessarily indicate a union with an eternal spirit in, for example, the Hindu theistic sense.

Practices 

Some key elements of Daoist practice include a commitment to self-cultivation, wu wei, and attunement to the patterns of the Dao. Most Daoists throughout history have agreed on the importance of self cultivation through various practices, which were seen as ways to transform oneself and integrate oneself to the deepest realities.

Communal rituals are important in most Daoist traditions, as are methods of self cultivation. Daoist self cultivation practices tend to focus on the transformation of the heartmind together with bodily substances and energies (like jing and qi) and their connection to natural and universal forces, patterns and powers.

According to Komjathy, Daoist practice is a diverse and complex subject and can include "aesthetics, art, dietetics, ethics, health and longevity practice, meditation, ritual, seasonal attunement, scripture study, and so forth." 

Throughout the history of Daoism, mountains have occupied a special place for Daoist practice. They are seen as sacred spaces and as the ideal places for Daoist cultivation and Daoist monastic or eremitic life, which may include "cloud wandering" (yunyou) in the mountains and dwelling in mountain hermitages (an) or grottoes (dong).

The nine practices 
One of the earliest schemas for Daoist practice was the "nine practices" or "nine virtues" (jiǔxíng 九行) which were taught in the Celestial Masters school. These were drawn from classic Daoist sources mainly the Daodejing, and are presented in the Laojun jinglu (Scriptural Statutes of Lord Lao; DZ 786).

The nine practices are:

Nonaction (wúwéi 無為)
Softness and weakness (róuruò 柔弱)
Guarding the feminine (shǒucí 行守)
Being nameless (wúmíng 無名)
Clarity and stillness (qīngjìng 清靜)
Being adept (zhūshàn 諸善)
Being desireless (wúyù 無欲)
Knowing how to stop and be content (zhī zhǐzú 知止足)
Yielding and withdrawing (tuīràng 推讓)

Rituals 

Ancient Chinese religion made much use of sacrifices to gods and ancestors. This could include slaughtered animals, such as pigs and ducks, or fruit. The Daoist Celestial Master Zhang Daoling rejected food and animal sacrifices to the gods. Today, many Daoist Temples reject animal sacrifice. Sacrifices to the deities remains a key element of Daoist rituals however. There are various kinds of Daoist rituals, which may include presenting offerings, scripture reading, sacrifices, incantations, purification rites, confession, petitions and announcements to the gods, observing the ethical precepts, memorials, chanting, lectures and communal feasts.

On particular holidays, like Qingming festival, street parades take place. These are lively affairs that involve firecrackers, the burning of hell money, and flower-covered floats broadcasting traditional music. They also variously include lion dances and dragon dances; human-occupied puppets (often of the "Seventh Lord" and "Eighth Lord"), gongfu and palanquins carrying images of deities. The various participants are not considered performers, but rather possessed by the gods and spirits in question.

Ethical precepts 
Taking up and living by sets of ethical precepts is another important practice in Daoism. By the Tang dynasty, Daoism had created a system of lay discipleship in which one took a set of ten Daoist precepts.

The first five Daoist precepts are identical to the Buddhist five precepts (which are to avoid: killing, theft, sexual misconduct, lying, and intoxicants like alcohol.) The other five were a set of five injuctions: (6) I will maintain harmony with my ancestors and family and never disregard my kin; (7) When I see someone do good, I will support him with joy and delight; (8) When I see someone unfortunate, I will support him with dignity to recover good fortune; (9) When someone comes to do me harm, I will not harbor thoughts of revenge; (10) As long as all beings have not attained the Dao, I will not expect to do so myself.Apart from these common ethical precepts, Daoist traditions also have larger sets of precepts which are often reserved for ordained priests or monastics.

Divination and magic 
A key part of many Daoist traditions is the practice of divination. There many methods used by Chinese daoists including: I Ching divination, Chinese astrological divination, feng shui (geomantic divination) and the interpretation of various omens.

Mediumship and exorcism is also a key element of some Daoist traditions. This can include There is tongji mediums and the practice of planchette writing or spirit writing.

Longevity practices 

Daoist longevity methods are closely related to ancient Chinese medicine. Many of these methods date back to Tang dynasty figures like alchemist Sun Simiao (582-683) and the Highest Clarity Patriarch Sima Chengzhen (647-735). The goal of these methods range from better health and longevity to immortality. Key elements of these "nourishing life" (yangsheng) methods include: moderation in all things (drink, food, etc), adapting to the cycles of the seasons by following certain injunctions, healing exercises (daoyin), breathwork, taking medicinal elixirs, and limiting sex and preventing ejaculation.

A number of physical practices, like modern forms of qigong, as well as modern internal martial arts (i.e. neijia), like Taijiquan, Baguazhang, Xingyiquan are practiced by Daoists as methods of cultivating health and longevity as well as eliciting internal alchemical transformations. However, these methods are not specifically daoist, and are often practiced outside of Daoist contexts.

Another key longevity method is "ingestion", which focuses on what one absorbs or consumes from one's environment, which is seen as affecting what one becomes. Diatectics, closely influenced by Chinese medicine, is a key element of ingestion practice, and there are numerous Daoist diet regimens for different effects (such as ascetic diets, monastic diets, therapeutic diets and alchemical diets that use herbs and minerals). One common practice is the avoidance of grains (bigu). In certain cases, practices like vegetarianism and true fasting is also adopted (which may also be termed bigu).

"Qi ingestion" (fu qi) is a special practice which entails the absoption of environmental qi as well as the light of the sun, moon and stars (and other astral effulgences and cosmic ethers) as a way to enhance health and longevity.

Meditation 

There are many methods of Daoist meditation (often referred to as "stillness practice", jinggong), some of which were strongly influenced by Buddhist methods.

Some of the key forms of Daoist meditation are:

 Apophatic or quietistic meditation, which was the main method of classical Daoism and can be found in classic texts like the Zhuangzi, where it is termed "fasting the heartmind" (xinzhai). This practice is also variously termed "embracing the one" (baoyi), "guarding the one" (shouyi), "quiet sitting" (jingzuo) and "sitting forgetfulness" (zuowang). According to Komjathy, this type of meditation "emphasizes emptiness and stillness; it is contentless, non-conceptual, and non-dualistic. One simply empties the heart-mind of all emotional and intellectual content." The texts of classical Daoism state that this meditation leads to the dissolution of the self and any sense of separate dualistic identity. Sima Chengzhen's Zuowang lun is a key text which outlines this method. The practice is also closely connected with the virtue of wuwei (non-action).
 Concentration meditation, focusing the mind on one theme, like the breath, a sound, a part of the body (like one of the dantiens), a diagram, or a mental image, a deity etc. A subset of this is called "guarding the one" which is interpreted in different ways.
 Observation (guan) - According to Kohn this method "encourages openness to all sorts of stimuli and leads to a sense of free-flowing awareness. It often begins with the recognition of physical sensations and subtle events in the body but may also involve paying attention to outside occurrences." Guan is associated withh deep listening and energetic sensitivy. The term most often refers to "inner observation" (neiguan), a practice which developed through Buddhist influence (see: Vipaśyanā). Neiguan entails developing introspection of one's body and mind, which includes being aware of the various parts of the body as well as the various deities residing in the body.
 Zhan zhuang ("post standing") - standing meditation in various postures
 Visualization (cunxiang) of various mental images, including deities, cosmic patterns, the lives of saints, various lights in the bodies organs, etc. This method is associated with the Supreme Clarity school, which first developed it.

Alchemy 

A key element of many schools of Daoism are alchemical practices, which include various rituals, meditations, exercises, and the creation of various alchemical substances. The goals of alchemy include physical and spiritual transformation, aligning oneself spiritually with cosmic forces, undertaking ecstatic spiritual journeys, improving physical health and extending one's life, and even becoming an immortal (xian).

Daoist alchemy can be found in early Daoist scriptures like the Taiping Jing and the Baopuzi. There are two main kinds of alchemy, internal alchemy (neidan) and external alchemy (waidan). Internal alchemy (neidan, literally: "internal elixir"), which focuses on the transformation and increase of qi in the body, developed during the late imperial period (especially during the Tang), and is found in almost all Daoist schools today, though it is most closely associated with the Quanzhen school. There are many systems of internal alchemy with different methods, including visualization, breathwork, ecstatic trance, and sexual practices. In the late Imperial period, neidan developed into complex systems which drew on numerous elements, including: classic Daoist texts and meditations, yangsheng, Yijing symbology, daoist cosmology, external alchemy concepts and terms, Chinese medicine, and Buddhist influences. Neidan systems tend to be passed on through oral master-disciple lineages and to often be secret.

Livia Kohn writes that the main goal of internal alchemy is generally understood as a set of three transformations: "from essence (jing) to energy (qi), from energy to spirit (shen), and from spirit to Dao." Common methods for this include conserving the subtle essences (often through celibacy or sexual practices), engaging the subtle body and activating the microcosmic orbit. Komjathy adds that neidan seeks to create a transcendent spirit, usually called the "immortal embryo" (xiantai) or "yang spirit" (yangshen).

Texts

Some religious Daoist movements view traditional texts as scriptures considered sacred, authoritative, and binding, as well as divinely inspired or revealed.

Perhaps the most influential texts are the Daodejing and the Zhuangzi.

Daodejing

Throughout the history of Daoism, the Daodejing has been a central text, used for ritual, self-cultivation, as well as philosophical purposes.

According to legend, the Daodejing (Scripture of the Dao and its power, also known as the Laozi) was written by Laozi. Authorship, precise date of origin, and even unity of the text are still subject of debate, and will probably never be known with certainty. The earliest manuscripts of this work (written on bamboo tablets) date back to the late 4th century BCE and these contain significant differences from the later received edition (of Wang Bi c. 226–249). Apart from the Guodian text and the Wang Bi edition, another alternative version exists, the Mawangdui Daodejings.

Luis Komjathy writes that the Daodejing is "actually a multi-vocal anthology consisting of a variety of historical and textual layers; in certain respects, it is a collection of oral teachings of various members of the inner cultivation lineages." Meanwhile, Kirkland argues that the text arose out of "various traditions of oral wisdom" from the state of Chu that were written, circulated, edited and rewritten by different hands. He also suggests that authors from the Jixia academy may have been involved in the editing process.

The Daodejing is not organized in any clear fashion and is a collection of different sayings on various themes. The leading themes of the Daodejing revolve around the nature of Dao, how to attain it and De, the inner power of Dao, as well as the idea of wei wu-wei. Dao is said to be ineffable and accomplishes great things through small, lowly, effortless and "feminine" (yin) ways (which are compared to the behavior of water).

Ancient commentaries on the Daodejing are important texts in their own right. Perhaps the oldest one, the Heshang Gong commentary, was most likely written in the 2nd century CE. Other important commentaries include the one from Wang Bi and the Xiang'er commentary.

Zhuangzi

The Zhuangzi (Book of Master Zhuang), named after its supposed author Zhuang Zhou, is a highly influential composite text of multi-vocal writings from various sources and historical periods. The commentator and editor Guo Xiang (c. CE 300) helped establish the text as an important source for Daoist thought. One traditional view is that a sage called Zhuang zhou wrote the first seven chapters (the "inner chapters") and his students and related thinkers were responsible for the other parts (the outer and miscellaneous chapters). However, some modern scholars like Russell Kirkland argue that Guo Xiang is actually the creator of the 33-chapter Zhuangzi text and that there is no solid historical data for the existence of Zhuang zhou himself (other than the sparse and unreliable mentions in Sima Qian).

The Zhuangzi uses anecdotes, parables and dialogues to express one of its main themes - avoiding cultural constructs and instead living in a spontaneous way aligned with the natural world. This way of living might be perceived as "useless" by most people who follow their own "common sense" and social and political rules, but this uselessness is actually a wiser alternative, since it is more in accord with reality.

Chinese classics

Daoism draws on numerous Chinese classics which are not themselves "Daoist" texts but remain important sources for Daoists. Perhaps the most important of these is the ancient divination text called the Yijing (circa 1150 BCE). The divination method in the Yijing and its associated concepts of yin and yang mapped into 64 "hexagrams" - combinations of the 8 trigrams - has influenced Daoism from its inception until today.

Daoism also drew on other non-daoist Chinese classic texts including:

 The Mozi, which was later adopted as a Daoist text by Daoists (who also saw master Mo - Mozi - as a Daoist immortal and included the Mozi into the Daoist canon). 
 The Hanfeizi (Writings of Master Han Fei), a "legalist" work which also contains themes which are key to Daoism, such as wu-wei
 Ruist (Confucian) classics like the Analects and the Mengzi
 Master Lü's Spring and Autumn Annals (Lüshi Chunqiu), which is widely quoted in early Daoist sources
 Huángdì Nèijīng (The Inner Canon of the Yellow Emperor), an ancient Chinense medical text which was influential on Daoist inner cultivation theory.
 Huainanzi (circa 139 BCE), an ancient source which includes Daoist, Ruist, and Legalist ideas.
 Guanzi, which discusses Daoist ideas in several chapters.

Other important Daoist texts 
There are many other important Daoist texts, including:

 Liezi (列子, Writings of Master Lie), a 4th century BCE classic Daoist work which during the Tang was seen as the third great Daoist work alongside the Daodejing and Zhuangzi.
 Neiye (內業, Inward Training, 4th century BCE), an important and ancient text which describes Daoist self-cultivation, Daoist meditation, how to work with qi and how to train one's heart-mind (xin) as well as one's body. The ideas found in this text influenced later Daoist conceptions of internal alchemy. 
 Wénzǐ; (文子, Book of Master Wen) a Daoist classic attributed to a Disciple of Laozi but which likely dates to the Han dynasty. 
 Huahujing (Classic on converting the barbarians), an old text (5th-6th century) which claims that Laozi traveled to China and is thus the source of Buddhism.
 The Taipingjing (Great Peace Scripture), a key source for Han dynasty Daoism.
 Liexian Zhuan (Biographies of Immortals), a Han dynasty text which is the earliest Daoist hagiography of Daoist immortals.
 The Baopuzi neipian (Inner Chapters of Master Embracing Simplicity) a work attributed to Ge Hong, also known as Baopu (Master who embraces simplicity) This text is a major source for Shangqing Daoism and its inner-cultivation practices.
The Daodong zhenjing (Perfect Scripture of the Great Cavern) and the Lingshu ziwen (Purple Texts Inscribed by the Spirits), the two most influential Supreme Clarity scriptures.
 Cāntóng qì (Kinship of the Three) - one of the earliest sources on Daoist internal alchemy (neidan).
 The Yellow Court Classic (Huang Ting Jing, 黄庭经) is a work on Daoist meditation revealed by Lady Wei Huacun of the Shangqing school in the 288 CE. It remained an influential Shangqin text and was also important for Lu Dongbin.
 Wupian zhenwen (Perfect Writings in Five Sections), the first of the Lingbao scriptures.
 Ling Bao Bi Fai (Complete Methods of the Numinous Treasure), a manual of longevity practices and neidan.
 Zuowanglun (坐忘論 ), a work on zuòwàng ("sitting forgetting") meditation by Sima Chengzhen (647–735) which is influenced by Buddhism. 
 Huángdì Yǐnfújīng (黃帝陰符經, c. 8th century CE), a text on internal alchemy and astrology.
 Huàshū (化書), a 10th century classic on internal alchemy.
 Qīngjìng Jīng (清静经, Classic of Clarity and Stillness) which Daoist teachings from the Daodejing with Mahayana Buddhist ideas. The text was adopted as one of the key scriptures of the Quanzhen school.
 Yinfu jing (Scripture on the Inner Talisman), a sixth century text which was adopted by Quanzen school as one of their key scriptures.
 Wùzhēn piān (悟真篇, Folios on Awakening to Reality) is a work on internal alchemy written by Zhang Boduan (張伯端; 987?–1082), a Song era scholar of the three teachings.
 The Lijiao shiwu lun (Fifteen discourses to Establish the Teachings) of Wang Chongyang, the founder of Quanzhen.
 The Book of Balance and Harmony (Zhong he ji, 中和集) a 13th century anthology by Daochun Li which outlines the teachings and practices of the Quanzhen School.
 Taishang Ganying Pian (Treatise of the Exalted One on Response and Retribution, C. 12th century) discusses sin and ethics, and has become a popular morality tract in the last few centuries. It asserts that those in harmony with Tao will live long and fruitful lives. The wicked, and their descendants, will suffer and have shortened lives.
 The Secret of the Golden Flower (太乙金華宗旨; Tàiyǐ Jīnhuá Zōngzhǐ), an influential neidan text from the late 17th century.
 The key texts of the Dragon Gate School (Longmen Pai) composed by the founder Wang Changyue (1622?-80) which focus on Daoist monasticism: Chuzhen jie (Precepts for Novices), Zhongji jie (Precepts of the Central Pole), Tianxian jie (Precepts for Celestial Immortals) and Longmen xinfa (Central Teachings of Dragon Gate).

The Daoist Canon

The Taoist Canon (Treasury of Tao) is also referred to as the Daozang. It was originally compiled during the Jin, Tang, and Song dynasties. The extant version was published during the Ming Dynasty. The Ming Daozang includes almost 1500 texts. Following the example of the Buddhist Tripiṭaka, it is divided into three dong ("caves", "grottoes"). They are arranged from "highest" to "lowest":
 The Zhen ("real" or "truth" ) grotto. Includes the Shangqing texts.
 The Xuan ("mystery" ) grotto. Includes the Lingbao scriptures.
 The Shen ("divine" ) grotto. Includes texts predating the Maoshan revelations.

Taoist generally do not consult published versions of the Daozang, but individually choose, or inherit, texts included in the Daozang. These texts have been passed down for generations from teacher to student.

The Shangqing School has a tradition of approaching Taoism through scriptural study. It is believed that by reciting certain texts often enough one will be rewarded with immortality.

Symbols and images

The Taijitu (commonly known as the "yin and yang symbol" or simply the "yin yang") and the Bagua  ("Eight Trigrams") are important symbols in Daoism, since they represent key elements of Daoist cosmology (see above). Many Daoist (as well as non-Daoist) organizations make use of these symbols and they may appear on flags and logos, temple floors, or stitched into clerical robes. According to Song dynasty sources, it originated around the 10th century CE.

The tiger and dragon are more ancient symbols for yin and yang respectively, and these two animals are still widely used in Daoist art. Daoist temples in southern China and Taiwan may often be identified by their roofs, which feature dragons, tigers, and phoenixes (with the phoenix also standing for yin) made from multicolored ceramic tiles. In general though, Chinese Daoist architecture lacks universal features that distinguish it from other structures.

Daoist temples may fly square or triangular flags. They typically feature mystical writing, talismans or diagrams and are intended to fulfill various functions including providing guidance for the spirits of the dead, bringing good fortune, increasing life span, etc. Other flags and banners may be those of the gods or immortals themselves.

Drawings of the Big Dipper (also called the Bushel) are also important symbols. In the Shang Dynasty of the 2nd millennium BCE, Chinese thought regarded the Big Dipper as a deity, while during later periods it came to symbolize Taiji. A related symbol is the flaming pearl, which stands for the pole star and may be seen on such roofs between two dragons, as well as on the hairpin of a Celestial Master.

Symbols which represent longevity and immortality are particularly popular, and these include: cranes, pine trees, and the peaches of immortality (associated with the goddess Xiwangmu). Natural symbols are also common, and include gourds, caves, clouds, mountains and the animals of the Chinese zodiac. Other symbols used by Daoists include: the Yellow River Map (hetu), the Luo Sho square, Yijing coins, Daoist talismans (fulu), the Four Symbols (mythical creatures), and various Chinese characters, such as the character for Dao and the shòu ("longevity") character.

Daoist priests also wear distinctive robes, such as the Daojiao fushi and Daoist versions of the Daopao, which symbolize their status and school affiliation.

Society

Daoist communities can include a wide variety of people and groups, including lay priests (daoshi), hermits, monastics, teachers, householders, ascetics, family lineages, teacher-disciple lineages, urban associations, temples and monasteries.

According to Kirkland, throughout most of its history, most Daoist traditions "were founded and maintained by aristocrats, or by members of the later well-to-do “gentry” class." The only real exception is the Celestial Masters movement, which had a strong basis in the lower classes (though even this movement had a hereditary leadership made up of figures of the Chang clan for generations).

Adherents
The number of Daoists is difficult to estimate, due to a variety of factors including defining Daoism. According to a survey of religion in China in 2010, the number of people practicing some form of Chinese folk religion is near to 950 million, which is 70% of Chinese. Among these, 173 million (13%) claim an affiliation with Daoist practices. 12 million people stated that they were "Daoists", a term traditionally used exclusively for initiates, priests and experts of Daoist rituals and methods.

Most Chinese people and many others have been influenced in some way by Daoist traditions. Since the creation of the People's Republic of China, the government has encouraged a revival of Daoist traditions in codified settings. In 1956, the Chinese Daoist Association was formed to administer the activities of all registered Daoist orders, and received official approval in 1957.

It was disbanded during the Cultural Revolution under Mao Zedong, but was reestablished in 1980. The headquarters of the association are at the Baiyunguan, or White Cloud Temple of Beijing, belonging to the Longmen branch of the Quanzhen tradition. Since 1980, many Daoist monasteries and temples have been reopened or rebuilt, both belonging to the Zhengyi or Quanzhen schools, and clergy ordination has been resumed.

Daoist literature and art has influenced the cultures of Korea, Japan, and Vietnam. Organized Taoism seems not to have attracted a large non-Chinese following until modern times. In Taiwan, 7.5 million people, 33% of the population, identify themselves as Taoists. Data collected in 2010 for religious demographics of Hong Kong and Singapore show that, respectively, 14% and 11% of the people of these cities identify as Taoists.

Followers of Daoism are present in Chinese émigré communities outside Asia. It has attracted followers with no Chinese heritage. For example, in Brazil there are Daoist temples in São Paulo and Rio de Janeiro which are affiliated with the Taoist Society of China. Membership of these temples is entirely of non-Chinese ancestry.

Art and poetry

Throughout Chinese history, there have been many examples of art being influenced by Daoism. Notable painters influenced by Daoism include Wu Wei, Huang Gongwang, Mi Fu, Muqi Fachang, Shitao, Ni Zan, Tang Mi, and Wang Zengzu. Daoist arts and belles-lettres represents the diverse regions, dialects, and time spans that are commonly associated with Daoism. Ancient Daoist art was commissioned by the aristocracy; however, scholars masters and adepts also directly engaged in the art themselves.

Political aspects
Daoism never had a unified political theory. While Huang-Lao's positions justified a strong emperor as the legitimate ruler, the Daoist "primitivists" (of chapters 8-11 of the Zhuangzi) argued for a kind of anarchism. A more moderate position is presented in the Inner Chapters of the Zhuangzi in which the political life is presented with disdain and some kind of pluralism or perspectivism is preferred.

The syncretist position found in texts like the Huainanzi and some of the Outer Chapters of the Zhuangzi blend Daoist positions with Confucian views.

Relations with other traditions

Many scholars believe Daoism arose as a countermovement to Confucianism. The philosophical terms Dao and De are indeed shared by both Daoism and Confucianism. Zhuangzi explicitly criticized Confucian and Mohist tenets in his work. In general, Daoism rejects the Confucian emphasis on rituals, hierarchical social order, and conventional morality, and favors "naturalness", spontaneity, and individualism instead.

The entry of Buddhism into China was marked by significant interaction and syncretism with Daoism. Originally seen as a kind of "foreign Daoism", Buddhism's scriptures were translated into Chinese using the Taoist vocabulary. Representatives of early Chinese Buddhism, like Sengzhao and Tao Sheng, knew and were deeply influenced by the Taoist keystone texts.

Daoism especially shaped the development of Chan (Zen) Buddhism, introducing elements like the concept of naturalness, distrust of scripture and text, and emphasis on embracing "this life" and living in the "every-moment". On the other hand, Taoism also incorporated Buddhist elements during the Tang dynasty. Examples of such influence include monasteries, vegetarianism, prohibition of alcohol, the doctrine of emptiness, and collecting scripture in tripartite organization in certain sects.

Ideological and political rivals for centuries, Daoism, Confucianism, and Buddhism deeply influenced one another. For example, Wang Bi, one of the most influential philosophical commentators on Laozi (and the I Ching), was a Confucian. The three rivals also share some similar values, with all three embracing a humanist philosophy emphasizing moral behavior and human perfection. In time, most Chinese people identified to some extent with all three traditions simultaneously. This became institutionalized when aspects of the three schools were synthesized in the Neo-Confucian school.

Comparisons between Daoism and Epicureanism have focused on the absence of a creator or gods controlling the forces of nature in both. Lucretius' poem De rerum natura describes a naturalist cosmology where there are only atoms and void (a primal duality which mirrors Ying/Yang in its dance of assertion/yielding), and where nature takes its course with no gods or masters. Other parallels include the similarities between Daoist "wu wei" (effortless action) and Epicurean "lathe biosas" (live unknown), focus on naturalness (ziran) as opposed to conventional virtues, and the prominence of the Epicurus-like Chinese sage Yang Chu in the foundational Daoist writings.

Some authors have undertaken comparative studies of Daoism and Christianity. This has been of interest for students of the history of religion such as J. J. M. de Groot, among others. A comparison of the teachings of Laozi and Jesus of Nazareth has been made by several authors, such as Martin Aronson, and Toropov & Hansen (2002), who believe that there are parallels that should not be ignored. In the opinion of J. Isamu Yamamoto, the main difference is that Christianity preaches a personal God while Daoism does not. Yet, a number of authors, including Lin Yutang, have argued that some moral and ethical tenets of the religions are similar. In neighboring Vietnam, Daoist values have been shown to adapt to social norms and formed emerging sociocultural beliefs together with Confucianism.

Daoist Traditions

Today, there are various living Daoist traditions, the largest and most influential are Quanzhen Daoism (Complete Perfection), particularly the Dragon Gate sect, and Zhengyi ("Orthodox Unity") Daoism. Quanzhen lineages are mainly monastic and ascetic tradition, based on meditation and internal cultivation, while the Orthodox Unity tradition is based on a lay priests (daoshi) who are expected to master an extensive ritual reperoure. These two traditions developed during the Song dynasty and grew to become recognized by the imperial government during late imperial China.

There are also various smaller Daoist groups and traditions of practice. Eva Wong divides the major "systems" of Daoism into the following categories: Magical Daoism, Divinational Daoism, Ceremonial Daoism, Internal-Alchemical Daoism and Action and Karma Daoism.

Magical Daoism 
Magical Daoism is one of the oldest systems of Daoism and its practices are similar to the shamans and sorcerers of ancient China. Magical Daoism believes there various natural powers, deities and spirits (benevolent and malevolent) in the universe that can be made use of by specialists who know the right methods. Their magic can include rainmaking, protection, exorcism, healing, traveling to the underworld to help the dead and mediumship.

Protection magic can include the use of amulets and daoist talismans as well specific rites. Protection rites often include ritual petitions to the celestial deities of the northern bushel.  Divination is also a widespread practice. A commonly used method of divination in magical daoism is sandwriting (planchette writing).

According to Eva Wong, the main sects of magical Daoism today are the Mao-shan sect (a very secretive sect, not to be confused with Shangqing), the Celestial Masters and the Kun-Lun sect (which is strongly influenced by Tibetan magic and make use of Daoist and Buddhist deities).

Divinational Daoism 

Divinational Daoism focuses on various divination techniques to help one predict the future and live accordingly. This practice can also carry deeper spiritual significance, since it can help one appreciate the flux of the Dao. This form of Daoism owes much to the ancient fang-shih, the ying yang school of thought and often relies on the classic Chinese divination text, the Yijing.

This tradition also relies on the cosmology of Wuji and Taiji, along with the teachings of yin and yang, the five elements and the Chinese calendar. There many forms of Daoist divination, they include: celestial divination (which include various systems of Chinese astrology, like Tzu-wei tu-su), terrestrial divination (feng shui), the casting of incense sticks with hexagrams on them and the interpretation of omens.

Contemporary divinational Daoism is practiced in temples and monasteries by various individuals and may not be sect specific (it is even practiced by non-daoists). This Daoist practice can be found in the Mao-shan sorcerers, the Celestial Masters sect and the Longmen and Wutang-shan sects. There are also many lay practitioners that are not affiliated with any specific sect. These lay Daoist practitioners are called "kui-shih".

Ceremonial Daoism 

Ceremonial Daoism focuses on ritual and devotion towards various celestial deities and spirits. The basic belief of ceremonial Daoism is that through various rites, human beings can honor the deities and these deities may then grant them with power, protection and blessings. Rituals and festivals can include chanting, offerings, and the reading of scripture. These rites are mostly performed by ritual masters who have trained extensively for this role and who may, through their mastery of ritual, intercede on behalf of laypersons.

There are various kinds of festivals in Ceremonial Daoism, including "Great Services" (chai-chiao) and Ritual Gatherings (fa-hui) that can last for days and can focus on repentance, rainmaking, disaster aversion or petitioning. There are feast days which honor specific deities. 164 Funerals and birthday blessings are a common service.

There is a complex and large pantheon in Daoism. It includes various deities classified into various ranks within an administrative structure, at the top of which are the celestial lords (t'ien-tsun). These include judges, heralds, officers, generals, clerks and messengers. The main division is between "earlier heaven" deities, who have existed since the beginning of time and "later heaven" deities, mortals who later became immortal.

146 Key earlier heaven deities include the Three Pure Ones, the Jade Emperor, the Queen Mother of the West, the Mother of the Bushel of Stars, the Seven Star Lords of the Northern Bushel and the Three Officials (Celestial, Earth, and Water). Some key later heaven deities include: Immortal Lu Tung-pin, and Emperor Kuan (Kuan-yu). Daoists may also honor local spirits and deities, as well Buddhist deities (like Guanyin, Amitabha, etc).

The largest and most prominent sect of Ceremonial Daoism is the Way of the Celestial Masters, also known as "Orthodox Unity" (Zhengyi). The patriarch of this sect resides in Taiwan and this tradition performs numerous ceremonies which are often sponsored by the Taiwanese government. The training for Zhengyi priesthood, who are not celibate, focuses mainly on learning extensive rituals and liturgy, so that they can perform them flawlessly.

Ceremonies are practiced, to a lesser extent, in the Longmen (Dragon Gate) sect of Quanzhen and in the Hsien-t'ien Dao (Earlier Heaven Way) sect, though these schools understand ritual as mainly a way to develop internal alchemy. During the Song dynasty, a popular form of ceremonial Daoism was the Thunder Rites (leifa), which focused on exorcism and protection.

Internal Alchemy Daoism 

Internal Alchemy Daoism or Transformation Daoism focuses on internal transformation through the use of various self-cultivation techniques like Qigong, Neidan (internal alchemy), Yangsheng and so forth. The basic worldview of this Daoist tradition is that all beings are born with certain forms of energy (mainly the three treasures of jing, qi and shen), which become dissipated, weak and lost as we age.

To prevent this and to increase our inner vital energies, one must practice various methods of "internal alchemy" (neidan) to harmonize the internal energy in one's body and refine the "golden elixir" (jindan) inside the body. These meditative inner alchemical practices are believed to lead to greater longevity and even immortality (union with the Dao at death).

Some traditions make use of Daoist sexual practices to achieve their alchemical goals (the "paired path", while others do not (this is called the singular path). Most traditions follow the "singular path", these include the Longmen (Dragon Gate) sect of Quanzhen Daoism, the Hsien-t'ien Dao (Earlier Heaven Way) sect, the Wu-liu sect, and the Wudang quan sect.

The Quanzhen school was founded by Wang Chongyang (1112–1170), a hermit in the Zhongnan mountains who was said to have met and learned secret methods from two immortals: Lu Dongbin and Zhongli Quan. He then moved to Shandong and preached his teachings, founding various religious communities. One of his "seven perfected" disciples, Qiu Chuji (1148–1227), founded the Longmen (Dragon Gate) lineage. Chuji was also made the leader of all religions in China by Chinggis Khan, making his tradition the most powerful in all of China, and contributing to Longmen's lasting influence. Another important Quanzhen lineage is the Qingjing pai, founded by the nun Sun Buer (1119–1182), the only female member of the "seven perfected." Today, Quanzhen is mainly made up of celibate monastics who practice vegetarianism, sobriety, internal alchemy and recite daily liturgies. The largest lineage is Longmen.

Much like Daoists who see writings made by influential members of their faith as having a divine nature, some Daoists view self-cultivation as a way for emotions and self to partake in divinity, and a smaller subset of these view some mythological beings such as xian as being divine.

Karmic Daoism 
Karmic Daoism, or "Action and Karma Daoism", according to Wong, focuses on ethics and is grounded in the idea that the sacred celestial powers aid and reward those who do good and punish those who do evil. This tradition can be traced back to Song dynasty Daoist Li Ying-chang and his Laozu Treatise on the Response of the Dao (T'ai-shang kan-ying p'ien). Li sparked a popular movement which focused on the everyday life of ordinary persons instead of on temples, monasteries and sages. At the core of this tradition is living in harmony with the Dao and with the Way of Heaven (Tian) - which means acting with benevolence, kindness and compassion. Doing evil is considered a transgression against the way and this evil will be punished by deities, celestial ministers and judges.

These ideas are quite ancient, the Taiping Jing (Scripture of Great Peace) states: "accumulate good deeds, and prosperity will come to you from the Dao". Besides wealth and prosperity, Karmic Daoism also believes that doing good increases longevity, while doing evil decreases it. Another common idea in this group of Daoist traditions is that there deities, like the Kitchen Lord, who monitor our actions and report to Heaven and the Jade Emperor (who tallies them and metes out punishment and reward).

Karmic Daoism is a non-sectarian tradition adopted by many Daoist sects. The Laozu Treatise on the Response of the Dao is studied in Quanzhen Daoism, Hsien-t'ien Dao and in the Wu-Liu sect. All major schools of Daoism view ethics as the foundation for spirituality. Furthermore, there are those who are not affiliated with a Daoist sect who may still follow Karmic Daoism in daily life.

See also

 Bagua
 Baopuzi
 Chinese culture
 Chinese ritual mastery traditions
 Dragon Gate Taoism
 Five precepts (Taoism)
 Hong Kong Taoist Association
 Lingbao School
 Neidan
 Pu (Taoism)
 Qingjing Jing
 Quanzhen Taoism
 Shangqing School
 Taiji
 Tao Te Ching
 Taoism in Hong Kong
 Taoism in Malaysia
 Taoism in Singapore
 Taoism in Vietnam
 Taoist Church of Italy
 Taoist coin charm
 Taoist diet
 Taoist music
 Taoist schools
 Taoist Tai Chi
 Ten precepts (Taoism)
 Way of the Celestial Masters
 Way of the Five Pecks of Rice
 Yao Taoism
 Zhengyi Taoism
 Zhizha
 Taoism and Confucianism

References

Citations

General sources

Further reading

 
 
 
 
 
 
 
 
 
 
 
 
 
 
 The Taoist Translations of Thomas Cleary: A Reader’s Guide. Shambala Publications.
 
 
 
 
 —with Pinyin transcription, interlinear and literary translation, contains a complete dictionary of the book Zhuangzi and a concordance to Laozi.

Popular (non-academic) interpretations of Taoism
 
 
 
 
 
 The Tao of Steve, a 2000 film directed by Jenniphr Goodman and starring Donal Logue.

External links

 BBC religions – Taoism
 
 
 Early Taoist texts – Chinese Text Project
 Patheos Library – Taoism
 Taoist Texts at the Internet Sacred Text Archive
 Collection: "Daoism/Taoism" from the University of Michigan Museum of Art

Taoism
Chinese astrology
Chinese folk religion
Classical Chinese philosophy
Dualism in cosmology
East Asian religions